The  was a light howitzer used by the Imperial Japanese Army during the Second Sino-Japanese War and World War II. Type 92 could be used in both direct and in-direct fire. Despite its odd appearance, the Type 92 was well-liked by the IJA. The Type 92 designation was for the year the gun was accepted, 2592 in the Japanese imperial year calendar, or 1932 in the Gregorian calendar.

History and development
The Type 92 battalion gun was designed in response to issues with the Type 11 37 mm infantry gun and the Type 11 70 mm infantry mortar. Both lacked sufficient firepower and range, and infantry divisions did not like the fact that they had to carry two different types of weapons with different ammunition into combat. As a result, the army technical bureau developed a design which could be used either at low angle direct fire to take out fortified positions, machine gun nests and light armor, but also could be used at high angle indirect support fire. The caliber of the new weapon was increased to 70 mm to address the issue of inadequate firepower. The new design was available to front line divisions by 1932.

Design
Somewhat unusual in appearance, the Type 92 battalion gun had a short gun barrel with a split trail carriage. The barrel could be configured from a horizontal to near vertical position with a hand-crank. It had an interrupted thread type, drop breechblock mechanism. Lightweight and maneuverable, it was designed to be pulled by a single horse, although in practice teams of three horses were usually assigned. The wheels were originally wooden, but were changed to steel after troops complained that the noise from the squeaky wooden wheels was a threat.

Combat record
The Type 92 battalion gun was first used in combat during the Manchurian Incident, and was subsequently in heavy use throughout the invasion of Manchuria, the Battle of Nomonhan and subsequent Second Sino-Japanese War. It later accompanied units assigned to the Pacific front and was used with considerable effectiveness against Allied forces throughout the South Seas Mandate and in Southeast Asia.

During the Indonesian National Revolution, Indonesian rebels used an estimated 50 Type 92 guns, but their use decreased as the war was going on. Significant quantities of Type 92 guns were captured by Nationalist and Communist forces in China following the cessation of hostilities in 1945. The People's Liberation Army, which also manufactured ammunition for them, kept them in service in the 1950s. Type 92s were still used, although more rarely than other guns, by the People's Liberation Armed Forces of South Vietnam during the Vietnam War.

Users 
 Imperial Japanese Army
People's Liberation Army (captured)
National Revolutionary Army (captured)
 
 Viet Cong's army

Ammunition

Performance

Surviving examples

Two guns are preserved and on display in a small park on Main Street in Lakeport, California.  One gun (on the southern side), with serial number 399, has unperforated sheet-metal wheels, while the wheels of the other gun (to the north) appear to have been restored with new material.

Two guns are at the Marine Recruiting Depot Museum in San Diego, California, put on display outdoors.

Another is on display in front of VFW Post 7589 in Manassas, VA.

One gun is on display at the Redcliffe branch of the RSL in Queensland, Australia, reliably reported as coming from WWII operations on the Kokoda Trail against the Japanese in Papua New Guinea. One other example is located at Army Museum Bandiana, Victoria as part of their artillery display.

A Type 92, without its shield, is displayed at the U.S. Army Field Artillery Museum at Fort Sill, Oklahoma. Its picture is attached here.

One Type 92, painted green, was formerly on display at Reflections at Bukit Chandu, a Singapore war museum dedicated to the Battle of Pasir Panjang during the Japanese invasion of the island in 1942. Following a recent renovation, the gun was removed and its current location is unknown.

A Type 92 gun is on display at the lobby entrance of Dharma Wiratama Museum, an Indonesian Army museum at Yogyakarta, Indonesia. The museum plaque mentioned that the gun was used during the Battle of Ambarawa in December 1945.

References

Bibliography
 War Department TM-E-30-480 Handbook on Japanese Military Forces September 1944
 Bishop, Chris (eds) The Encyclopedia of Weapons of World War II. Barnes & Nobel. 1998. 
 Chamberlain, Peter and Gander, Terry. Light and Medium Field Artillery. Macdonald and Jane's (1975). 
 Chant, Chris. Artillery of World War II, Zenith Press, 2001, 
 McLean, Donald B. Japanese Artillery; Weapons and Tactics. Wickenburg, Ariz.: Normount Technical Publications 1973. .
 US Department of War, TM 30-480, Handbook on Japanese Military Forces, Louisiana State University Press, 1994.

External links

 US Technical Manual E 30-480
 Type 92 Walkaround on Dishmodels.ru
 Taki's website

Gallery

Notes

World War II field artillery
9
70 mm artillery
Military equipment introduced in the 1930s